Belgium participated at the 2017 Summer Universiade in Taipei, Taiwan with 30 competitors in 10 sports.

Competitors 
The following table lists Belgium's delegation per sport and gender.

Medalists

Archery

Athletics

Men

Track Events

Field Events

Women

Track Events

Field Events

Combined Events

Heptathlon

Badminton

Fencing

Gymnastics

Artistic

Men

Women

Judo

Swimming

Table Tennis

Taekwondo

Weightlifting

References

Nations at the 2017 Summer Universiade
2017 in Belgian sport